Henders is a surname. Notable people with the surname include:

Richard Coe Henders (1853–1932), Canadian farmer, Methodist minister, and politician
Richard Henders, British actor

See also
Hender